Françoise Wilhelmi de Toledo (born 1953 in Geneva, Switzerland) is a physician and researcher for fasting. She is the founder of the Medical Association for Fasting and Nutrition (ÄGHE) and Managing Director of the family-owned company Buchinger Wilhelmi, established by Otto Buchinger in 1953.

Life 
Françoise Wilhelmi de Toledo graduated from medical school in Geneva in 1982 and continued her education in Switzerland. She earned her doctoral degree in Basel. The title of her dissertation was “Methodical Problems in Assessing the Vitamin Balance in Fasting.” 

In 2012 she completed her education with an Executive Master for Family Entrepreneurship M.A. from Zeppelin University in Friedrichshafen, Germany.

She fasted for the first time when she was 17 years old. From then on, she devoted herself to the method and continued to contribute actively to the development of fasting therapy and so-called “integrative medicine” today.

In 1982 she married Raimund Wilhelmi, the grandson of Otto Buchinger, they have two sons. Since then she started to play an active role in managing the family business. This comprises Buchinger Wilhelmi clinics in Überlingen, Germany (founded in 1953) and in Marbella, Spain (founded in 1973).

As Scientific Director of Buchinger Wilhelmi in Überlingen and Marbella, Françoise Wilhelmi de Toledo is responsible for the medical program and the scientific documentation of fasting in collaboration with various universities (Charité in Berlin, CNRS in Strasbourg) as well as the Institute for Longevity at the University of Southern California (USC). She co-founded the Medical Association for Fasting and Nutrition (Ärztegesellschaft für Heilfasten und Ernährung, ÄGHE e.V.) in 1986, and published guidelines for fasting therapy in 2003.

In 2011 she founded the Maria Buchinger Foundation with the aim of supporting research in the field of therapeutic fasting. She continues to chair this foundation today. In addition, she was President of the Soroptimist Club in Überlingen from 2016 to 2018.

Publications 
El ayuno terapéutico Buchinger: Una experiencia para el cuerpo y el espíritu. 2003, 
Lebensreform Gestern - zukunftsfähige Lebensweise heute und morgen. In: 40 Jahre Eden Stiftung - Zur Förderung naturnaher Lebenshaltung und Gesundheitspflege. Bad Soden 2004, S. 46–53.
Leitfaden Ernährungsmedizin. Heilfasten. 2005, 
Fastentherapie. Lehrbuch Naturheilverfahren. 2009, 
Médecines et alimentation du futur. La médecine intégrative et le jeûne thérapeutique. 2009, 
Ernährung und Fasten als Therapie. 2010, 
Buchinger Heilfasten: Die Original-Methode. 2010,  • Therapeutic Fasting: The Buchinger Amplius Method. 2011, 
L’art de jeûner: manuel du jeûne thérapeutique. 2015,

References

External links 
 Françoise Wilhelmi de Toledo SWR

1953 births
Living people
20th-century Swiss physicians
Swiss nutritionists
Swiss medical researchers
Swiss businesspeople
Swiss women physicians